The Ahan Tongshan Cup is a Chinese Go competition.

Outline
The Ahan Tongshan Cup is a Go tournament played with fast time controls: Each player has 30 seconds per move, along with 10 one-minute periods of extra thinking time. The format is single elimination. As of 2022, the winner receives 200,000 RMB in prize money.

The Ahan Tongshan Cup is the Chinese counterpart of the Agon Kiriyama Cup in Japan. Both tournaments are sponsored by Agon Shu. The winners of the two tournaments play against each other in the China-Japan Agon Cup.

Past winners and runners-up

References

See also

 List of professional Go tournaments

Go competitions in China